Dear Love may refer to:

 Dear Love (album), a 2012 album by Suzie McNeil
 Dear Love: A Beautiful Discord, a 2006 album by the Devil Wears Prada
 "Dear Love", a song from the 1965 musical Flora the Red Menace by Kander and Ebb